Meiseken is a 1937 German drama film directed by Hans Deppe and starring Josef Eichheim, Susi Lanner and Oskar Sima. It is based on the play Meiseken by Hans Alfred Kihn. The film's sets were designed by the art directors Robert A. Dietrich and Artur Günther.

Cast
 Josef Eichheim as Alois Brüggler, Kleinbauer
 Rotraut Richter as  Hedwig, Brügglers Enkelin
 Susi Lanner as Ursula Meiseken
 Franz Zimmermann as Toni Hämmerlein, Direktor
 Fritz Kampers as Sebastian Huber, Gastwirt
 Irmgard Hoffmann as Resi Huber, Gastwirtin
 Oskar Sima as Aulinger, Handwerker
 Maria Wolf as Vevi, Magd
 Beppo Brem as Michel, Knecht
 Albert Karchow as Hämmerleins Abteilungsdirektor
 Klaus Pohl as Hämmerleins Abteilungsdirektor
 Josef Reithofer as Hämmerleins Abteilungsdirektor
 Ewald Wenck as 	Hämmerleins Abteilungsdirektor
 Leo Peukert as 	Hämmerleins Bürodiener
 Josef Berger as 	Gendarm
 Arnulf Schröder as 	Finanzbeamter
 Franz Fröhlich as Feuerwehrhauptmann
 Helen Fichtmüller as Hämmerleins Sekretärin Frl. Hoffmann
 Michael Distler as Beschwipster Bauernbursche
 Walter Schuller as 	Beschwipster Bauernbursche

References

Bibliography 
 Goble, Alan. The Complete Index to Literary Sources in Film. Walter de Gruyter, 1999.
 Niven, Bill, Hitler and Film: The Führer's Hidden Passion. Yale University Press, 2018.

External links

1937 films
Films of Nazi Germany
1937 drama films
1930s German-language films
Films directed by Hans Deppe
German films based on plays
German black-and-white films
German drama films
1930s German films